Rodney Tiffen is an Australian emeritus professor of political science in the Department of Government and International Relations at the University of Sydney.

Tiffen was educated at Monash University, and is considered a specialist in Australian mass media. Tiffen has authored 39 books, Tiffen also co-authored a popular reference book, How Australia Compares, with Ross Gittins, a journalist from the Sydney Morning Herald.

Selected works
Tiffen, R. (1990). News and Power. North Sydney, Australia: Allen and Unwin.
Tiffen, R. (2001). Diplomatic Deceits. Government, Media and East Timor. Sydney: University of New South Wales (UNSW) Press.
Tiffen, R., Gittins, R. (2004). How Australia Compares. Australia: Cambridge University Press.
Tiffen, R. (2017) Disposable leaders. New South Press

References

Year of birth missing (living people)
Living people
Australian political scientists
Academic staff of the University of Sydney
Monash University alumni